Ban Bat (also spelled Banbatt) is one of the five sub-districts (khwaeng) in the Pom Prap Sattru Phai District of Bangkok of Thailand. Some parts of the northern area are on the Khlong Maha Nak canal. The west side borders the Samran Rat Sub-district of Phra Nakhon District.

History & toponymy 

The name Ban Bat means "alms bowl community".

Locals believe that their ancestors immigrated from Ayutthaya after its fall in 1767. In 1782, Phyra Phutthayotfa Chulalok (Rama I) established what is today's Bangkok. The refugees settled there, but the date of their migration is unclear. They were known for creating monk's alms bowls, which required handcrafting and manual labor. This tradition has lasted to the modern day. Locals have established the Ban Bat Community, a group that preserves the monk's alms bowl tradition and sells alms bowls to visitors as souvenirs.

Ban Bat was also home to the house and band of Luang Pradit Pairoh, who was regarded as a master of traditional Thai music.

Places
Another old community, Ban Dokmai, is nearby. It has a tradition of making fireworks ("firework" in Thai called dokmai fai (literally 'flame flower'). Similar to the alms bowls of Ban Bat, this tradition may be lost.

Other points of interest include the following:

 Wat Saket and Golden Mount
 Maen Si Intersection
 Sommot Amon Mak Bridge
 Ban Dokmai Palace of Prince Purachatra Jayakara
Khlong Thom

Moreover, the area around Wat Saket is also a large source of the shops that line a comprehensive range of wood products and handicraft. Currently, some of them have moved to settle in Bang Pho, Bang Sue District.

References

External links

Pom Prap Sattru Phai district
Neighbourhoods of Bangkok
Subdistricts of Bangkok